Athma Liyanage is a Sri Lankan singer and songwriter. He became popular in the early 90s with the song 'Liyathambara'. He gained popularity with the Millennial generation with his new songs 'Ayemath adaren' and 'Sitha dura handa'.

Discography

Singles
"Liyathambara" (1989)
Epa Kandulel Sala (1989)
"Kandu pamula sita"
"Ayemath adaren" (2011)
"Sitha dura handa" (2011)
"Na Thawath Hithak" (2015)
"Ahimi Nethu Aga" (2016)

Albums
Liyathambara One Man Orchestra (1989)

References

External links
Athma Liyanage at iTunes
Athma Liyanage at Last.fm
Athma Liyanage at Amazon.com
Athma Liyanage Songs List

20th-century Sri Lankan male singers
Sri Lankan singer-songwriters
Sinhalese singers
Living people
Year of birth missing (living people)
Place of birth missing (living people)
21st-century Sri Lankan male singers